Astrobotic Technology is an American privately held company that is developing space robotics technology for lunar and planetary missions. It was founded in 2007 by Carnegie Mellon professor Red Whittaker and his associates with the goal of winning the Google Lunar X Prize. The company is based in Pittsburgh, Pennsylvania. The first launch of one of its spacecraft, the Peregrine lunar lander, is expected to take place in the first quarter of 2023.

On June 11, 2020, Astrobotic received a second contract for the Commercial Lunar Payload Services program. NASA will pay Astrobotic US$199.5 million to take the VIPER rover to the Moon, targeting a landing in November 2024.

History 
The team stated a goal from the start in 2007: to be the first commercial operation to land their Red Rover on the Moon, using their Artemis Lander. The company's first running prototype of Red Rover was completed the same year, and the concept lander was renamed Griffin.

On July 28, 2008, NASA awarded Astrobotic funding for a concept study on "regolith moving methods", and the next year, Astrobotic began to receive Small Business Innovation Research (SBIR) funding from NASA totaling over US$795,000 to investigate prospecting for lunar resources, which eventually led to a concept called Polar Excavator.

On October 15, 2010, NASA awarded a contract to Astrobotic for Innovative Lunar Demonstrations Data (ILDD) firm-fixed-price indefinite-delivery/indefinite-quantity contracts with a total value up to US$30.1 million over a period of up to five years, and in December 2010, NASA's US$500,000 ILDD project for further Lunar Demonstrations Data was awarded to Astrobotic.

Astrobotic's "Technologies Enabling Exploration of Skylights, Lava Tubes, and Caves", was a Phase I selection for NASA Innovative Advanced Concepts (NIAC). In April 2011, Astrobotic received a US$599,000 two-year contract to develop a scalable gravity offload device for testing rover mobility in simulated lunar gravity under NASA's Small Business Technology Transfer Program (STTR).

In May 2012, David Gump left the position of President of Astrobotic and John Thornton took his place.

On April 30, 2014, NASA announced that Astrobotic Technology was one of the three companies selected for the Lunar CATALYST initiative. NASA was negotiating a 3-year no-funds-exchanged Space Act Agreement (SAA) where the Griffin lander may be involved. The CATALYST agreement was extended in October 2017 for 2 years.

On June 2, 2016, Astrobotic Technology announced a new design of its Griffin concept lander and named it Peregrine. Airbus Defence and Space signed a memorandum of understanding to provide engineering support for Astrobotic as it refines the lander's design. In December 2016, Astrobotic slipped their estimated launch date to 2019 and separated from the Google Lunar X Prize.

On November 29, 2018, Astrobotic was declared eligible to bid on NASA's Commercial Lunar Payload Services to deliver science and technology payloads to the Moon. Astrobotic's successful bid entailed a US$79.5 million contract to deliver payloads to Lacus Mortis. Astrobotic set an initial target of fourteen payloads to launch starting in July 2021.

In September 2019, Spacebit signed an agreement to deliver the first UK lunar rover Asagumo on Astrobotic's upcoming mission in 2021 and named this "Spacebit mission one".

On September 25, 2019, John Thornton of Astrobotic was named CEO of the Year by the Pittsburgh Technology Council at the 23rd annual Tech50 awards ceremony.

On January 24, 2021, MrBeast, a YouTuber, announced that he would be placing a payload, a hard drive containing large numbers of digital image files submitted by anyone who contributed US$10 via his online store, on the Peregrine lander.

In June 2021, the maiden flight of Vulcan Centaur, carrying the first Peregrine lander as its payload, was delayed to 2022 due to payload and engine testing delays.

In November 2021, Astrobotic Technology was named one of the 'World's Best Employers in the Space Industry' by Everything Space, a recruitment platform specializing in the space industry.

Commercial payload pricing 

Lunar missions

Icebreaker (canceled) 
In April 2011, Astrobotic contracted with SpaceX for a Falcon 9 launch of a lunar north pole mission for as early as December 2013. The launch date slipped to 2015, and it was first named Polar Excavator, and then Icebreaker, that would target the lunar north pole. This expedition's rover was to be Polaris. A model of the Polaris rover was unveiled in October 2012, and the company indicated that they were still under contract to SpaceX for a Falcon 9 mission. The launch date further slipped to 2016, and Astrobotic contracted with two other GLXP teams including Team Hakuto and Team AngelicvM to share the launch expenses. The agreement was to launch the rovers of all teams on a single SpaceX Falcon 9 v1.1 which would then use the Astrobotic Griffin lander. After landing on the lunar surface, all teams would have competed against each other to achieve the specific GLXP objectives and earn the various prizes. The Griffin lander was never built, and Icebreaker mission was not launched.

Mission One 
In July 2017, Astrobotic announced an agreement had been reached with United Launch Alliance (ULA) to launch their Peregrine lander aboard a Vulcan Centaur launch vehicle. This first lunar lander mission, called Mission One, was initially planned to be launched in July 2021.

A small rover, weighing , named Spacebit is included, and it moves on four legs. It is a technological demonstrator and will travel a distance of at least .<ref>UK's 1st Moon Rover to Launch in 2021  Mike Wall, 'Space.com October 12, 2019</ref> Other payloads aboard the lander is a library, in micro print on nickel, which will include Wikipedia contents and Long Now Foundation's Rosetta Project.

On November 29, 2018, Astrobotic was made eligible to bid on NASA's Commercial Lunar Payload Services (CLPS) to deliver science and technology payloads to the Moon, and in May 2019, it was awarded its first lander contract for NASA. Therefore, in addition to the 14 commercial payloads, the lander will carry 14 NASA-sponsored payloads, for a total of 28.

In June 2021, United Launch Alliance CEO Tory Bruno announced that the maiden flight of Vulcan Centaur, with Mission One aboard, had been delayed to 2022 due to payload and engine testing delays. As of December 2022, Mission One is expected to be launched in Q1 2023.Peregrine will carry a maximum payload mass of  during Mission One, and it is planned to land on Gruithuisen Gamma.

 Spacecraft 
  Peregrine lander 

The Peregrine lander was announced in 2016. It inherits designs from their previous concept lander called Griffin, which was larger but with the same payload capacity. Astrobotic had contracted Airbus Defence and Space to provide additional engineering support as they refine the lander's design.Peregrine bus structure is mainly manufactured out of aluminum alloy, and it is reconfigurable for specific missions. Its propulsion system features a cluster of five thrusters, built by Frontier Aerospace. Each thruster produces 150 lb (667 N) thrust. This propulsion system would propel the trans-lunar injection, trajectory corrections, lunar orbit insertion, and powered descent. The propulsion system is capable of delivering an orbiter to the Moon and then performing a powered soft landing. For attitude control (orientation), the spacecraft uses twelve thrusters (45 N each) also powered by MON-25/MMH.

The spacecraft's avionics systems incorporate guidance and navigation to the Moon, and a Doppler LiDAR to assist the automated landing on four legs. From Mission 2 Its landing ellipse will be 100 m x 100 m, down from 24 km × 6 km previously.

Its electrical systems will be powered by a lithium-ion battery that is recharged by a solar panel made of GaInP/GaAs/Ge. Radiators and thermal insulators are used to dispose of excess heat, but the lander does not carry heaters, so the first few Peregrine landers are not expected to survive the lunar night, which lasts 14 Earth days. Future missions could be adapted to do so.

For communications to Earth, the lander uses different frequencies within the X-band range for uplink as well as downlink. Following landing, a 2.4 GHz Wi-Fi modem enables wireless communication between the lander and deployed rovers on the lunar surface.

 Payload suppliers 

 Payloads on Peregrine 
 Lunar rovers 

 Instruments 

 Time capsules 

 DHL MoonBox 

 Other spacecraft 

 Canceled 

 Griffin lander 
The Griffin lander is targeted to land in a region of interest in the south polar region of the Moon in November 2024. The spacecraft is expected to operate for 100 days after its landing. NASA's VIPER will be the main payload on the larger Griffin lander (450 kg). VIPER will investigate permanently shadowed regions of craters located in the moon's south pole, specifically for potential deposits of water ice that could be used as resources for future crewed missions. Other commercial payloads are on board the Griffin lander, including the Lunar Codex's Polaris archive of contemporary culture as one of the commercial sub-payloads of Astrobotics' MoonBox initiative.

 Rovers 
Astrobotic has a line of three rovers called Polaris, CubeRover,  and MoonRanger.

 CubeRover is a class of planetary rovers with a standardized format meant to accelerate the pace of space exploration. The idea is equivalent to that of the successful CubeSat format, with a standardized architecture to assemble new units that will be all compatible, modular, and inexpensive. The rover class concept is being developed by Astrobotic Technology in partnership with Carnegie Mellon University, and it is partly funded by NASA awards. The principal investigator of the program is Andrew Horchler. The first derivative of a CubeRover, a spinoff rover called Iris developed by CMU students, is planned to be deployed on the Moon in 2022 on board Astrobotic's Peregrine lander.
 MoonRanger is a  rover being developed to carry payloads on the Moon for NASA's Commercial Lunar Payload Services (CLPS). The US$5.6 million contract was awarded to Astrobotic and its partner Carnegie Mellon University on July 1, 2019.Astrobotic gets US$5.6m NASA contract to develop MoonRanger rover  Brittany A. Roston, Slash Gear July 1, 2019 MoonRanger'' will be launched aboard Masten Mission One, the first XL-1 lunar lander, which is currently scheduled to launch in November 2023. The rover will carry science payloads yet to be determined and developed by other providers, that will focus on scouting and creating 3D maps of a polar region for signs of water ice or lunar pits for entrances to Moon caves. The rover would operate mostly autonomously for up to one week.

See also 

 Exploration of Mars
 Exploration of the Moon
 Lunar rover
 Mars rover

References

External links 
 

Private spaceflight companies
American companies established in 2008
Aerospace companies of the United States
Engineering companies of the United States
Google Lunar X Prize
2023 in spaceflight
Companies based in Pittsburgh
Proposed space probes
Commercial Lunar Payload Services
Peregrine Payloads